Pedro Bonifacio Suárez Pérez, commonly known as Arico Suárez or Pedro Suárez (5 June 1908, in Gran Canaria, Spain – 18 April 1979, in Buenos Aires, Argentina), was a Spanish-Argentine football left half who played for Boca Juniors where he won five league championships and for the Argentina national team, including appearances at the inaugural FIFA World Cup in 1930, making him the only Canary Islander to play in the World Cup until Juan Carlos Valerón played the 2002 edition.

Playing career

Club
Suárez was born in Santa Brígida (Gran Canaria) but emigrated to Argentina with his parents at a young age. He began his playing career in 1926 with Ferro Carril Oeste where he played until his transfer to Boca Juniors in 1930.

In his first season with Boca, Suárez was part of the team that won the 1930 league championship. Over the following decade he won afurther four league championships in 1931, 1934, 1935 and 1940. He also won the Copa Ibarguren in 1940. Arico made a total of 335 appearances in all competitions, scoring one goal which came in a 2–2 draw with Platense on 6 August 1933.

International
Suárez made his international debut for Argentina during the 1930 FIFA World Cup, he would go on to make a total of 12 appearances for the Argentina national team between 1930 and 1940.

Honours
Boca Juniors
Primera División Argentina (5): 1930, 1931, 1934, 1935, 1940
Copa Ibarguren (1): 1940

References

External links
 Biography at Informe Xeneize
 Pedro "Arico" Suárez at Historia del futbol Canario
 Statistics at Historia de Boca

1908 births
1979 deaths
People from Gran Canaria
Sportspeople from the Province of Las Palmas
Footballers from the Canary Islands
Spanish footballers
Argentine footballers
Spanish emigrants to Argentina
Naturalized citizens of Argentina
Argentina international footballers
1930 FIFA World Cup players
Association football defenders
Ferro Carril Oeste footballers
Boca Juniors footballers
Argentine Primera División players